Lisa Gelius (23 July 1909 in Munich – 14 January 2006 in Kreuth) was a German versatile athlete.

Biography

She competed in the 60 meters, 100 meters, 80 meters hurdles and javelin throw in the 1932 Olympics. She found success at the Women's World Games in 1930, 1934 and at the 1938 European Championships. She became German champion twelve times from 1928 to 1940. After the Second World War she continued her sports career until 1950.

Personal best time
80 metres hurdles: 11.7 ( Bad Nauheim, 7 September 1938)

Achievements
At the 1930 Women's World Games she won the gold medal in the 4 x 100 metres event with team mates Rosa Kellner, Agathe Karrer and Luise Holzer.

See also
Women's 80 metres hurdles world record progression

References

External links
 Athlete profile from site Track and Field Statistics

1909 births
2006 deaths
Sportspeople from Munich
German female sprinters
German female hurdlers
German female javelin throwers
German female discus throwers
German female shot putters
European Athletics Championships medalists
Women's World Games medalists